Evergrande Center is a supertall skyscraper on-hold designed by Hanhai Architectural Design Co., Ltd. in the Baishi 4th road & Shenwan 3rd road, Shenzhen Bay, Shenzhen, China.

See also 
 List of tallest buildings
 List of tallest buildings in China

References 

Skyscrapers in Shenzhen
Towers in China
Corporate headquarters